Federico Arias (born 24 April 1979) is a former Argentine footballer who played for clubs in Argentina, Chile, Peru, Venezuela and England.

He signed for English side Southampton in January 2003. but left the club in May of the same year without making a single first team appearance. He played as a striker.

References

External links
 

1979 births
Living people
Argentine expatriate footballers
Argentine footballers
Club Atlético Belgrano footballers
Club Atlético Vélez Sarsfield footballers
Quilmes Atlético Club footballers
Rosario Central footballers
Southampton F.C. players
Sporting Cristal footballers
Coronel Bolognesi footballers
Deportes Melipilla footballers
Chilean Primera División players
Argentine Primera División players
Expatriate footballers in Chile
Expatriate footballers in Peru
Expatriate footballers in England
Expatriate footballers in Venezuela
Association football wingers
Footballers from Rosario, Santa Fe